Orsolya Vérten (born 22 July 1982) is a Hungarian retired handballer who played for the Hungarian national team.

She made her international debut in 2002 and participated in the European Championship in the same year, finishing fifth. She played in another three European Championships (2006, 2008, 2010).
Vérten was also present at three World Championships between 2005 and 2009, achieving the best result on her first one, when Hungary captured the bronze medal.

She competed at the 2008 Summer Olympics in Beijing, where she finished fourth, after losing 20–22 to Russia in the semifinal, and falling short 28–33 to South Korea in the bronze medal match. Vérten was voted into the tournament's All-Star Team in left wing position.

In that year she also received the Hungarian Handballer of the Year award, given out by the Hungarian Handball Federation. Vérten was awarded the prestigious prize once again in the following year.

Achievements
Nemzeti Bajnokság I:
Winner: 2005, 2006, 2008, 2009, 2010, 2011, 2012, 2015
Silver Medalist: 2004, 2007
Bronze Medalist: 2002, 2003
Magyar Kupa:
Winner: 2005, 2006, 2007, 2008, 2009, 2010, 2011, 2012
Finalist: 2002, 2004, 2015
EHF Champions League:
Finalist: 2009, 2012
Semifinalist: 2007, 2008, 2010, 2011
EHF Cup Winners' Cup:
Finalist: 2006
Semifinalist: 2003, 2015
EHF Cup:
Finalist: 2002, 2004, 2005
Junior World Championship:
Silver Medalist: 2001
World Championship:
Bronze Medalist: 2005
European Championship:
Bronze Medalist: 2012

Individual awards
 Hungarian Handballer of the Year: 2008, 2009
 All-Star Left Wing of the Olympic Games: 2008

Personal
She gave birth to her son, Magor in June 2018 and Lelle in Juli 2020 and November 2021 Zolna.

References

External links
Orsolya Vérten career statistics at Worldhandball

1982 births
Living people
Handball players from Budapest
Hungarian female handball players
Olympic handball players of Hungary
Handball players at the 2008 Summer Olympics
Győri Audi ETO KC players
Ferencvárosi TC players (women's handball)